Velars-sur-Ouche (literally Velars on Ouche) is a commune in the Côte-d'Or department in eastern France. The composer Pierre Desvignes (1764 – 1827) was born in this village.

Population

See also
Communes of the Côte-d'Or department

References

Communes of Côte-d'Or